Ming Mang may refer to:

 Minh Mang (emperor), second emperor of Vietnam
 Ming Mang (game), Tibetan strategy game